Finola MacDonald, styled after her marriage as Dame Finola Ó Domhnaill or Finola, Lady Ó Domhnaill, and better known by the Irish nickname Iníon Dubh (pronounced in both Scots Gaelic and Ulster Irish as 'In-neen Doo'), was queen consort of Tyrconnell (fl. 1570–1608). She was the daughter of Séamus Mac Dhòmhnaill, 6th Laird of Dunnyveg (James MacDonald, 6th Laird of Dunnyveg), and his wife, Lady Agnes MacDonald (née Campbell), and became the second wife of Sir Aodh mac Maghnusa Ó Domhnaill (Sir Hugh McManus O'Donnell), king of Tyrconnell. She was the mother of eight children, including four sons. Her offspring included Hugh Roe O'Donnell, Rory, 1st Earl of Tyrconnell, and Cathbarr O'Donnell.

Background
The daughter of James MacDonald, 6th Chief of Clan MacDonald of Dunnyveg, and Lady Agnes (née Campbell) MacDonald, Iníon Dubh (pronounced 'In-neen Doo') was raised at the Stuart court in the Kingdom of Scotland, and her powerful connections ensured a healthy recruitment of Scottish Redshanks from Clan Donald to O'Donnell's armies after her marriage to him in around 1570. She bore four sons, including the last two reigning Kings of Tyrconnell, Hugh and Rory. When her husband, Sir Hugh, grew senile in his old age, she took over the effective leadership of the territory. She is described in the Annals of the Four Masters as "like the mother of Machabees who joined a man's heart to a woman's thought".

Political activity
In 1587, her eldest son, Hugh Roe O'Donnell, was kidnapped and imprisoned in Dublin Castle. In his absence, she devoted herself to defending her son's claim to the chieftaincy. 

In 1588 she had her nephew, Hugh Gavelach O'Donnell, assassinated. According to the Annals of the Four Masters, "Hugh had constantly sided with the descendants of Calvagh O'Donnell, who were all conjointly leagued with O'Neill (Turlough Luineach), who was always at war with O'Donnell and his son-in-law, the Earl O'Neill (Hugh, son of Ferdorcha). Moreover, her dearly beloved brother, Alexander, had been, as we have before stated, slain by Hugh, son of the Dean, and besides these she had many other causes of enmity towards him; and it was sickness of heart and anguish of mind to her that revenge was not taken of him for his pride and arrogance. She complained of her troubles and injuries to the Scottish auxiliaries, who were constantly in her service and pay, and who were in attendance on her in every place; and they promised that they would be ready at her command, to wreak vengeance upon their enemies, whenever they should meet with them. Hugh one time happened to be coming up, in pride, vigour, and high spirits (without remembering the spite or the enmity against him ) towards the place where she was, at Magh-gaibhlin. When he had come to the town, she addressed her faithful people, i.e. the Scots; and begged and requested of them to fulfil their promise. This was accordingly done for her, for they rushed to the place where Hugh was, and proceeded to shoot at him with darts and bullets, until they left him lifeless; and there were also slain along with him the dearest to him of his faithful people."<ref> [https://celt.ucc.ie//published/T100005E/index.html Annals of the Four Masters, 1588].</ref>

In 1590, Iníon Dubh's stepson through her husband's first marriage, Sir Domhnall Dubh Ó Domhnaill, attempted to depose his father and seize power. In response, Iníon Dubh gathered an army of all those still loyal to her husband, including Clan Sweeney, O'Doherty, and many Redshanks from Clan Donald. When their armies came to blows, Domhnall Dubh was defeated and killed by Iníon Dubh on September 14, 1590, at the Battle of Doire Leathan. Throughout this period she made repeated attempts to secure Red Hugh's release or escape from Dublin Castle.

When Red Hugh finally escaped in 1592, Iníon Dubh bought off the remaining claimant, Niall Garbh Ó Domhnaill, and persuaded her husband to abdicate in their son's favour. Historian Hiram Morgan notes that the election of Red Hugh as The O'Donnell Chief of the Name at the Rock of Doon in 1592 was, "a stage managed affair in which the influence of his mother was paramount".

She retired to Kilmacrennan. In 1608, with all her sons dead, she implicated her son-in-law, Niall Garbh, in plotting against King James I and saw him sent to the Tower of London, where he later died. Her date of death is unknown. In her later years, she also maintained Mongavlin Castle, a small fortress on the banks of the River Foyle, as a residence just south of St Johnston, The Laggan, East Donegal.

O'Donnell family tree

In popular culture
 In the 1966 Disney film The Fighting Prince of Donegal, Iníon Dubh was portrayed onscreen by actress Marie Kean.
 The life of Iníon Dubh is fictionalized in the historical novel Dark Queen of Donegal'' by Mary Pat Ferron Canes and JR Foley. .

References

17th-century Irish women
People from County Donegal
People of Elizabethan Ireland
17th-century Irish people
16th-century Irish people
17th-century Scottish people
16th-century Scottish people
O'Donnell dynasty
Clan Donald
Clan MacDonald of Dunnyveg
Year of birth unknown
Year of death unknown